Stu Hunter is an Australian musician and record producer. His album The Migration was nominated for 2016 ARIA Award for Best Jazz Album.

Discography

Albums

Awards and nominations

AIR Awards
The Australian Independent Record Awards (commonly known informally as AIR Awards) is an annual awards night to recognise, promote and celebrate the success of Australia's Independent Music sector.

|-
| AIR Awards of 2010
|The Gathering 
| Best Independent Jazz Album
| 
|-

ARIA Music Awards
The ARIA Music Awards is an annual awards ceremony that recognises excellence, innovation, and achievement across all genres of Australian music. Oehlers has been nominated for three awards.

! 
|-
| 2016
| The Migration
| Best Jazz Album
| 
| 
|-

References

External links
stu hunter

Australian jazz musicians
Living people
Year of birth missing (living people)